The Ford GT is a mid-engine two-seater sports car manufactured and marketed by American automobile manufacturer Ford for the 2005 model year in conjunction with the company's 2003 centenary. The second generation Ford GT became available for the 2017 model year.

The GT recalls Ford's historically significant GT40, a consecutive four-time winner of the 24 Hours of Le Mans (1966–1969), including a 1-2-3 finish in 1966.


First generation (2005–2006)

Development

The Ford GT began life as a concept car designed in anticipation of the automaker's centennial year and as part of its drive to showcase and revive its "heritage" names such as Mustang and Thunderbird. At the 2002 North American International Auto Show, Ford unveiled a new GT40 Concept car. Camilo Pardo, the then head of Ford's "Living Legends" studio, is credited as the chief designer of the GT and worked under the guidance of J Mays. Carroll Shelby, the original designer of the Shelby GT 500, was brought in by Ford to help develop the GT; which included performance testing of the prototype car. While under development, the project was called Petunia.

The GT is similar in outward appearance to the original GT40, but is bigger, wider, and most importantly  taller than the original's  overall height; as a result, a potential name for the car was the GT44. Although the cars are visually related, structurally, there is no similarity between the modern GT and the 1960s GT40 that inspired it. After six weeks from the unveiling of the GT40 concept, Ford announced a limited production run of the car. Three pre-production cars were shown to the public in 2003 as part of Ford's centenary celebrations, and delivery of the production version called simply the Ford GT began in the fall of 2004.

As the Ford GT was built as part of the company's 100th anniversary celebration, the left headlight cluster was designed to read "100".

Naming difficulties
A British company, Safir Engineering, who built continuation GT40 cars in the 1980s, owned the "GT40" trademark at that time. When production of the continuation cars ended, they sold the excess parts, tooling, design, and trademark to a small Ohio based company called Safir GT40 Spares. This company licensed the use of the "GT40" trademark to Ford for the initial 2002 show car. When Ford decided to put the GT40 concept to production stage, negotiations between the two firms failed as Ford did not pay the US$40 million the owners of the name demanded. Thus, the production cars are simply called the GT.

Production 
The GT was produced for the 2005 and 2006 model years. The car began assembly at Mayflower Vehicle Systems (MVS) in Norwalk, Ohio and was painted and continued assembly at Saleen Special Vehicles (SSV) facility in Troy, Michigan, through contract by Ford. The GT is powered by an engine built at Ford's Romeo Engine Plant in Romeo, Michigan. Installation of the engine and transmission along with seats and interior finishing was handled in the SVT building at Ford's Wixom, Michigan plant.

Of the 4,500 cars originally planned, approximately 100 were to be exported to Europe, starting in late 2005. An additional 200 cars were destined for sale in Canada. Production ended in September 2006 without reaching the planned production target. Approximately 550 cars were built in 2004, nearly 1,900 in 2005, and just over 1,600 in 2006, for a grand total of 4,038 cars. The final 11 car bodies manufactured by Mayflower Vehicle Systems were disassembled, and the frames and body panels were sold as service parts. The Wixom Assembly Plant has stopped production of all models as of May 31, 2007. Sales of the GT continued into 2007, from cars held in storage and in dealer inventories.

Heritage edition 
Ford produced a total of 346 Heritage editions, recognizable by the Gulf Oil-inspired livery. The livery is in honor of the back to back wins of Ford at the 1968 and 1969 24 Hours of Le Mans by the GT40 Mk I.

Sales and marketing 

When the Ford GT was first announced, the demand outpaced supply, and the cars initially sold for premium prices. The first private sale of Ford's new mid-engine sports car was completed on August 4, 2004, when former Microsoft executive Jon Shirley took delivery of his Midnight Blue 2005 Ford GT. Shirley earned the right to purchase the first production Ford GT (chassis #10) at a charity auction at the Pebble Beach Concours d'Elegance Auction after bidding over US$557,000.

A few other early cars sold for as much as a US$100,000 premium over the suggested retail price of US$139,995. Optional equipment available included a McIntosh sound system, racing stripes, painted brake calipers, and forged alloy wheels adding US$13,500 to the MSRP.

Performance and engineering 

The Ford GT features many technologies unique at its time including a superplastic-formed frame, aluminum body panels, roll-bonded floor panels, a friction stir welded center tunnel, covered by a magnesium center console, a "ship-in-a-bottle" gas tank, a capless fuel filler system, one-piece panels, and an aluminum engine cover with a one-piece carbon fiber inner panel.

Brakes are four-piston aluminum Brembo calipers with cross-drilled and vented rotors at all four corners. When the rear canopy is opened, the rear suspension components and engine are visible.

The 5.4 L longitudinal rear mounted Modular V8 engine is an all-aluminum alloy engine with an Eaton 2300 Lysholm screw-type supercharger. It features a forged rotating assembly housed in an aluminum block designed specifically for the car. A dry sump oiling system is employed, allowing the engine to sit low in the car's frame. The DOHC 4 valves per cylinder heads are a revision of the 2000 Ford Mustang SVT Cobra R cylinder heads (with slightly increased wall casting thickness in the exhaust port). The camshafts have unique specifications, with more lift and duration than those found in the Shelby GT500. A Ricardo 6-speed manual transmission is fitted featuring a helical limited-slip differential. Car and Driver tested the GT in January 2004 and recorded a 0- acceleration time of 3.3 seconds.

Performance:

Top speed: 
: 11.8 seconds
: 3.8 seconds
: 12.3 seconds
: 44.3 seconds

Fuel consumption

Other media 
The GT won Top Gears Gas Guzzler of the Year award in 2005. One of the show's presenters, Jeremy Clarkson, owned a GT and despite initially reserving high acclaim for the vehicle, ultimately requested a refund from Ford due to extensive problems with the car's aftermarket alarm system.

During the GT's production run, the car was featured on the cover of the video game Gran Turismo 4, and was also featured in Need for Speed: Carbon and Need for Speed: ProStreet, as well as being made into physical form in the Transformers: Alternators toyline, which featured realistic cars turning into Cybertronians; the Ford GT mold was used for the characters Mirage and Rodimus.

Standing mile speed record 
Modified versions of the Ford GT have established several speed records, including the standing mile.

Ford GTX1 

The Ford GTX1 is an aftermarket roadster iteration of the Ford GT introduced by the company at the 2005 SEMA Show. The car was built by Mark Gerisch, owner of Genaddi Design Group from Green Bay, Wisconsin with assistance from Ford. Kip Ewing, a development engineer who had been involved in the development of the GT and conceived the idea, supervised the project. The resulting chassis is ten percent less stiff than the standard GT.

The design was inspired by the open top GT40 which was conceived in the 1960s. The car had a modified engine cover, modified doors (with roof portions removed) and a central removal roof bar. Two roof pieces could be installed and removed when the roof bar was installed making the car a T-top, a canvas roof panel would be installed when the roof bar was removed. The car had headrests inspired from the Porsche Carrera GT.

The car received a positive response at the show and customers urged Ford to build this version of the GT but the end of the production of the GT in the forthcoming year meant that it would be expensive to produce another limited variant of the car. The GTX1 was offered as a kit by the body shop adding US$38,000 to the price of a standard Ford GT. The involvement of Ford in the process meant that the warranty and other obligations on the car were unaltered.

A total of 100 orders for the GTX1 were received and completed over a two-year planned production period, these including the exact copies of the SEMA show car. The GTX1 was featured in various automotive publications along with several reviews.

Second generation (2016–2022)

At the 2015 North American International Auto Show and at the unveiling of the 2015 racing video game Forza Motorsport 6, the second-generation Ford GT was shown to the public with plans for production in 2016, after a decade-old hiatus from the first generation. The car marked 50 years since the GT40 won the 1966 24 Hours of Le Mans and competed successfully in the 2016 24 Hours of Le Mans to better celebrate the anniversary, winning the LM GTE-Pro class, taking 1st and 3rd in class.

Development 
The development of the second generation GT at Ford was a very secretive operation–according to design director Chris Svensson, "a handful of twelve people, including some key engineers, had access to the [design studio]". This secrecy was maintained inside Ford and to the press until its 2015 unveiling at the North American Auto Show.

The design of the new GT began with its aerodynamics package, which was closely related to the ultimate focus of the design team of creating a successful Le Mans race car. Low downforce and aerodynamic efficiency were of primary importance in the development of the exterior of the car, and this drove designers to pursue a 'teardrop profile' as often seen in LMP1 cars. The powertrain of the new GT, therefore, became a secondary criterion to the external design and aerodynamic performance of the car. Although a V8 and even a V12 engine were both considered, it was ultimately decided to use Ford's EcoBoost V6 engine due to the degrees of freedom that the compact engine gave designers.

The intent behind the design was for the overall look of the second generation GT to be recognizable as a part of the GT line, which meant, for example, a cut back front nose piece, circular tail lights, and raised twin exhaust pipes. There was no explicit requirement for luxury or practicality in the design of the road car, which is the reason behind the car's negligible cargo space and spartan interior. The interior seating position was fixed to provide additional space for the bodywork and teardrop exterior shape.

Overview 
Like its predecessor, the new Ford GT is only offered as a 2-door coupe with the mid-rear layout, for the purpose of improved stability by keeping the center of gravity near the middle. The new GT's weight distribution is 43% front and 57% rear. Unlike the first generation car, the new GT has butterfly doors that no longer include a piece integrated into the roof.

Powertrain 

The engine shares many components with the F-150's 3.5 L V6 engine including the cylinder heads, block and dual fuel system. Notable differences include larger turbochargers, an aluminum intake manifold, a custom dry sump lubrication system, unique camshafts and higher strength rotating and timing drive components.

The engine is paired to a Getrag 7DCL750 7-speed dual-clutch transmission.

Chassis 
Underpinning the new GT is a carbon fiber monocoque bolted to aluminum front and rear subframes covered in carbon fiber body panels. The windshield of the vehicle is made of Gorilla Glass manufactured by Corning, which is also used for manufacturing smartphone screens. The Gorilla Glass is used to reduce the weight of the vehicle by allowing for a thinner windscreen with the same strength as a normal glass windscreen.

Suspension 
The new GT uses a pushrod suspension system, which move the primary components of the suspension inboard and provide space for the large aerodynamic elements in the bodywork of the car. These drive modes also dynamically adjust the dampening component of the suspension, which consists of two springs stacked in series. In Track and Vmax modes, one of these springs is completely locked to increase the overall spring rate of the system. The car also has a front-axle lifting system for clearing road obstacles and steep entry angles.

Wheels 

The new GT is the second Ford vehicle to feature optional carbon fiber wheels, after the Shelby Mustang GT350R. In addition to improved strength and rigidity, these wheels weigh  less than their forged aluminum counterparts. The wheels have a diameter of 20 inches at the front and rear, and come equipped with Michelin Pilot Sport Cup 2 tires with codes of 245/35 R 20 for the front and 325/30 R 20 for the rear. The brakes are ventilated carbon-ceramic discs made by Brembo, with six-piston calipers at the front and four-piston calipers at the rear.

Aerodynamics 

The most prominent exterior features of the new GT are the open airflow tunnels built into the rear fenders of the car, referred to as the 'flying buttresses'. These large aerodynamic elements, enabled by the compact V6 engine and pushrod suspension design, channel air around the teardrop-shaped cockpit over the rear spoiler for increased downforce. The front end of the GT features a GT40-inspired cutaway nose and vents in the hood that pass oncoming air over the top of the car. The rear features a large diffuser and hollow circular tail lights that expel air taken in by vents built into the flying buttresses.

The active rear spoiler of the GT can adjust and adapt to different driving conditions and modes depending on how much downforce is needed. In Track mode, a gurney flap will extend from the trailing edge of the wing to further increase downforce, and the wing will flip vertical to help stop the car under heavy braking.

Performance 
Independent acceleration figures are provided below.

 : 10.8 seconds at 
 0-: 3.0 seconds
 0-: 6.2 seconds
 0-: 10.1 seconds
 0-: 14.5 seconds
 0-: 21.4 seconds

At the Willow Springs International Raceway, Motor Trend test driver Randy Pobst achieved a hot lap time of 1:23.69 in a 2017 GT, which at the time made it the fourth-fastest road car tested between the 2015 Porsche 918 Spyder (1:23.54) and the 2017 Porsche 911 Turbo S (1:24.26). After suffering from mechanical issues during an earlier test by automotive magazine Car and Driver, racing driver Billy Johnson set a lap time around Virginia International Raceway of 2:38.62 in a 2017 GT. This places it third overall in Car and Driver's testing history at the circuit, between the 2019 Chevrolet Corvette ZR1 (2:37.3) and the 2018 Porsche 911 GT2 RS Weissach (2:37.8).

Production 
Production began in December 2016 and is scheduled to continue through 2022, with a planned production rate of one car per day at Multimatic's low-volume assembly facility in Markham, Ontario, Canada. Approximately two hundred 2017 and 2018 year production cars were recalled to fix potential hydraulic leaking and fire risk. The cars produced for the 2017 and 2018 model years are allocated through Ford Performance's vehicle allocation process. The cars produced for the 2019 model year were primarily for buyers unsuccessful in the initial selection process, and the cars produced for the 2020 model year are for new customers.

2020 model year update 
For the 2020 model year, the Ford GT received an update that introduced several mechanical upgrades and new special editions. The 3.5 L EcoBoost V6 is now rated at  due to gallery-cooled pistons and more powerful ignition coils. New engine tuning also results in a 'broader torque band' according to Ford, although peak torque output remains unchanged. The updated GT also comes standard with a new titanium exhaust system developed by Akrapovič, which saves  over the original exhaust. The suspension stiffness in Track mode has also been further increased, and cooling airflow into the flying buttresses has been improved by new vent design in this updated model.

Special editions 

There have been number of special edition series for the new GT, often involving unique liveries, materials, or interior changes. These special editions include:

 Competition Series (2017–2018): The closest one can get to the car that won the 2016 Le Mans, with all optional carbon fiber parts fitted, with interior weight savings from deletion of A/C, radio hardware, and storage bins.
 '66 Heritage Edition (2017): Matte or metallic black paint with #2 graphics to honor the winning GT40 Mk II at the 1966 24 Hours of Le Mans.
 '67 Heritage Edition (2018): Race red paint with #1 graphics to honor the winning GT40 Mk IV at the 1967 24 Hours of Le Mans.
 '68–'69 Heritage Edition (2019–2020): Blue and orange Gulf Oil livery with #9 (2019) or #6 (2020) graphics to honor the back to back wins at the 1968 and 1969 24 Hours of Le Mans by the GT40 Mk I.
Liquid Carbon (2020): Exposed carbon fiber body and wheels for the 2020 model year, at an increased price of US$750,000.
'66 Heritage Edition (2021): White, red, and carbon exterior with #98 graphics to honor the GT40 Mk II's win at the 1966 24 Hours of Daytona.
 '64 Heritage Edition (2022): White with black accents to mimic the livery of the sole remaining GT40 prototype car, the 1964 GT/105.
 Alan Mann Heritage Edition (2022): Signature Alan Mann Racing livery in red and gold to tribute to Alan Mann Racing's 1966 Ford GT lightweight experimental prototypes.
 Holman Moody Heritage Edition (2022): Gold and red livery to honor the podium-placing Holman Moody GT40 Mk II, chassis no. P/1016.
 LM Edition (2022): Painted in Liquid Silver with a choice of either red or blue accents, as tribute to the 2016 Le Mans-winning GT, which wore a red and blue livery.

GT Mk II 
A track-day-only version of the new GT, named the GT Mk II, was launched on 4 July 2019 at the Goodwood Festival of Speed. The name pays homage to the original GT40 Mk II race car that won the 1966 24 Hours of Le Mans.

The GT Mk II features many substantial changes from the road car that increase its capabilities on the track. The active spoiler has been replaced by a much larger fixed wing, which in combination with a larger diffuser and new aerodynamic elements results in a 400% increase in downforce over the road car. The GT Mk II uses smaller 19-inch wheels and Michelin Pilot Sport GT slick racing tires, although it shares the GT's carbon ceramic brakes.

As a result of these changes, the GT Mk II is not street legal. Only 45 will be built, and at a unit price of US$1.2 million it is the most expensive new Ford ever sold. The Mk II, however, is not sold by Ford but rather directly to customers by Multimatic, the Canadian manufacturer of all GT cars.

GT Mk IV 
To commemorate Ford's victory at the 1967 24 Hours of Le Mans, Ford and Multimatic built another track-only Ford GT inspired by the Ford GT40 Mk IV, priced at $1.7 million; the car targets more than 800 horsepower as a performance figure. 67 examples will be built by Ford as a final sendoff to the Ford GT.

Racing

Overview
The Ford GT has been campaigned in various racing venues. These include:
 A highly modified GT was raced in 2006 and 2007 in Super GT's GT300 class in Japan powered by a 3.5 L Ford Zetec-R engine produced by Cosworth in the mid-1990s for Formula One.
 Matech Concepts from Switzerland entered three Ford GTs modified to GT3 class specifications in the FIA GT3 European Championship. Matech won the Teams title in the 2008 Championship. 
 Atlanta-based Robertson Racing entered a Doran-built Ford GT-R in the American Le Mans Series GT class (formerly GT2). The team made its first 24 Hours of Le Mans appearance in 2011, scoring 3rd position overall in the GTE Am Class.
 Black Swan Racing entered a Falken Tires-sponsored Ford GT-R in the GT2 class in the American Le Mans Series during the 2008 season.
 Ford Chip Ganassi Racing formerly ran 4 factory-supported LM-spec Ford GT LM GTE-Pro racecars. Two in the FIA World Endurance Championship under the LM GTE-Pro class during the 2016, 2017, & 2018–19 seasons and two in the WeatherTech SportsCar Championship in the GTLM class during the 2016, 2017, 2018, & 2019 seasons. At the end of the 2019 season, Ganassi announced that it would end their factory race program with Ford after four years.

First generation

Ford GT GT1

The Ford GT GT1 is a racing version of the Ford GT developed by Matech Concepts to comply with FIA GT1 rules. The official race debut of the Ford GT1 coincided with the kick-off of the 2009 FIA GT Championship season in Silverstone. For the 2010 FIA GT1 World Championship season four cars were built and fielded by two teams: Matech Competition and Marc VDS Racing Team. Three cars competed in the 2010 24 Hours of Le Mans race, with two (the number 70 car run by the Marc VDS Racing Team and the number 61 car run by Matech Concepts) retiring early on. The third car retired later in the race. For the 2011 FIA GT1 World Championship season, Matech left the series which left Marc VDS running the four cars during the season, two under the Marc VDS Racing Team name and the other two cars under the name of Belgian Racing.

Ford GT GT3

The Ford GT was also homologated for the FIA GT3 rules by Matech Concepts. The Ford GT GT3 was involved in numerous championships including the FIA GT3 European Championship, FIA GT1 World Championship, Blancpain Endurance Series, and others. The GT3 version is slower than the GT1 version (rated at around  instead of ) and features different bodywork.

Second generation

Ford GT LM GTE-Pro by Ford Chip Ganassi Racing
On 12 June 2015, at Le Mans, it was announced that Ford will return to the 24 Hours of Le Mans in 2016 with a factory-supported, four-car effort operating as Ford Chip Ganassi Racing with the LM-spec Ford GT LM GTE-Pro. The Ford Chip Ganassi Racing cars campaigned in both the IMSA WeatherTech SportsCar Championship and the FIA World Endurance Championship. The car debuted at the 2016 24 Hours of Daytona on January 30–31 finishing seventh and ninth in class.

On June 19, 2016, the #68 Ford GT of Ford Chip Ganassi Racing finished first at the 24 Hours of Le Mans in the LM GTE-Pro class; the victory marked fifty years after Ford won the 24 Hours of Le Mans in 1966, where they came first, second, and third with the GT40. In the 2016 6 Hours of Fuji and the 6 Hours of Shanghai, both the Ford GT's finished 1–2 at both races, the #67 winning both and the #66 coming second in both.

In the opening WEC race at Silverstone, the #67 Ford GT took victory. Two races later, on June 19, 2017, the #67 Ford GT of Ford Chip Ganassi Racing finished runner up at the 24 Hours of Le Mans in the LM GTE-Pro class; this time fifty years after the second Le Mans Race win in 1967.

Race victories

See also
 Galpin GTR1

References

External links

 
 Motor Trend GT Report 
 Ford GT racing team

GT
Coupés
Rear mid-engine, rear-wheel-drive vehicles
Retro-style automobiles
Roadsters
Motor vehicles manufactured in the United States
Cars introduced in 2003
2010s cars
2020s cars